José María Orellana Pinto (11 July 1872 – 26 September 1926) was a Guatemalan political and military leader. He was chief of staff of President Manuel Estrada Cabrera and President of Guatemala between 1921 and 1926, after overthrowing Conservative Unionist President Carlos Herrera. During his rule the Quetzal was established as the currency of Guatemala. Orellana Pinto died under suspicious circumstances in 1926 at the age of fifty-four. He was buried in the Guatemalan capital with state honors.

Early life 

José María Orellana Pinto was born in El Jícaro; he was the son of Esteban Orellana and Leonora Pinto. Orellana had a military career becoming General of the Guatemalan Army. He was elected to the Guatemalan legislature on several occasions, as a member of the Liberal Party, and was also Chief of Staff of the President Estrada Cabrera; when serving as such, on 29 April 1907, he was riding alongside the president's coach when the latter suffered a bomb attack -which had been planned by the brothers Avila Echeverría and some of their relatives and friends-. Miraculously, both the president and Orellana were unharmed by the assassination attempt and almost immediately initiated the prosecution of the perpetrators.

Coup d'état against Carlos Herrera 

On 5 December 1921, general Orellana -sponsored by the United Fruit Company- lead a coup d'état against president Carlos Herrera who had resisted to approve the concessions granted to the United Fruit Company and its subsidiaries by his predecessor, Manuel Estrada Cabrera. Orellana had the help of several army officers, among them general Jorge Ubico.

Presidency 

On 5 December 1921, Orellana was appointed as Interim President, and eventually became Constitutional President after winning the elections the following year. During his term in office, he ratified concessions that the government of Estrada Cabrera had made to the United Fruit Company (UFCO) and that Herrera had refused to ratify. He also encouraged the creation of a tripartite republic formed by Guatemala, Honduras and El Salvador, but this was unsuccessful. In 1923, in celebration of the birth centennial of liberal writer and ideologist Dr. Lorenzo Montúfar y Rivera, the government erected a monument to his memory in Avenida Reforma.

Economy 

Gum raw material extraction in the northern department of Petén was sold to Percy W. Shufeldt, who carried out the operation without paying taxes; unlike his predecessor—Carlos Herrera—Orellana gave favorable contracts such as the Shufeldt one to foreign companies. Another examples was the Electric Company, which had been expropriated from German shareholders after World War I, and was sold to the American Bond and Share Company on 4 May 1922.

Orellana promoted the construction of hundreds of kilometers of railways and was pressured by the International Railways of Central America to enforce the Méndez-Williamson railroad contract, signed in 1908 by then president Manuel Estrada Cabrera.  When Estrada Cabrera was ousted, IRCA had intended to enact this agreement but the acting president Carlos Herrera refused to implement the contract; after Herrera was overthrown, Orellana ratified the contract on 10 March 1922.

The Guatemalan Congress issued the following laws during his term in office:
 Ratified the Central American Union Covenant held in San Jose, Costa Rica. 
 Approved the contract for light, heat and electric power services, held in Guatemala City between government representatives and the Central America Power Company.
 Hydrocarbons law 
 Ratified executive Decree 798, by which Archbishop Luis Javier Muñoz y Capurón remained in exile. 
 Approved the contract between the government and Emilio Capoulliez, proxy for Washington Serruys, for the installation of an electric tram.
 Approved the contract between the Ministry of Development and the All America Cables Incorporated company to build a public telegram office in Guatemala City
 Approved the contract with AEG from Berlin, Germany, to continue and complete the Los Altos Railway  and the Santa María power plant.
 Approved oil exploration contracts with US companies. 
 Work Act 
 Endorsed and encourage a national soap industry development.

The United Fruit Company 

  Dockworkers strike: In mid-1924, Puerto Barrios workers -key to banana transport- demanded an 8-hour day and increased wages. When UFCO refused to accept, workers went on strike, with the support from all workers in the farms of the frutera. UFCO asked the Guatemalan government for help, and Orellana quickly sent troops to restore order in Puerto Barrios; the collision was brutal and resulted in numerous workers injured or dead. The strike lasted 27 days, but repression tactics finished it: 22 leaders were jailed and then expelled from the country. 
  Railroad strike : In late 1924, the employees of International Railways of Central America (IRCA) demanded the reduction of working hours, higher wages and respect to their labor union. Railway Society. Again, the frutera flatly refused to accept these demands and ordered Orellana's government to violently repress the strike of five thousand workers.

Cultural references 

 Rafael Arevalo Martinez talks about Orellana in numerous occasions in his biography of Estrada Cabrera ¡Ecce Pericles!.  
 Orellana is also mentioned, though not by name, in the Guatemalan novels El Señor Presidente, Viernes de Dolores and Viento Fuerte of Nobel Laureate Miguel Angel Asturias. In Viernes de Dolores, Asturias calls Orellana by his nickname: Rapadurero.  
 Given that during his rule the Quetzal was instituted as the Guatemalan currency, his image appears on the one quetzal bills, which are colloquially called "chemas". 
 His cousin, general Manuel María Contreras Orellana later would lead a coup against interim president Baudilio Palma in December 1930.

Death 

On 25 May 1926, El Imparcial -a private newspaper- had published a news flash: Martial law enacted which referred to executive decree 916, in which President Orellana had suspended the individual guarantees contained in the Constitution; the main reason for such decision was that "insidious and unpatriotic activities of certain elements" tended "to disrupt the peace and development of the country", which, at once, made it impossible to solve the national economic problem. Although El Imparcial was not circulating regularly in the previous days -due to a government boycott-, after 26 May it ceased publication indefinitely. Thereafter, only the official news outlets, such as Diario de Centro América and El Guatemalteco,  could circulate, carrying irrelevant information. The story took a sudden turn on Sunday 26 September when, at 0:15 pm, Orellana died during a vacation trip to Antigua Guatemala; he was in a room at Hotel Manchén. "A violent angina attack ended the life of our illustrious president," explained Diario de Centro America in a special edition that day. These strange circumstances led to the suspicion that he was poisoned. General Lázaro Chacón assumed as interim President and immediately lifted Martial Law and allowed private newspaper to be published again.

References

Bibliography

Notes 

1872 births
1926 deaths
People from El Progreso Department
Guatemalan people of Spanish descent
Liberal Party (Guatemala) politicians
Presidents of Guatemala
Leaders who took power by coup
Manuel Estrada Cabrera
Guatemalan generals
Burials in Guatemala
20th-century Guatemalan people